"Fool #1" is a song written by Kathryn R. Fulton and performed by Brenda Lee.    The song was featured on Lee's 1962 album, Brenda, That's All.

Chart performance
The song reached No. 3 on the Billboard Hot 100 and No.38 in the UK (where it was entitled "Fool No.1", because the # symbol was not synonymous with the word 'number' for British audiences) in 1961.  The song also reached No. 23 in Australia.

The single's B-Side, "Anybody But Me", reached No. 31 on the Billboard Hot 100.

Other versions
Johnny Tillotson released a version on his 1962 album, It Keeps Right On a-Hurtin'.
Loretta Lynn released a version on her 1964 album, Before I'm Over You.
Connie Smith released a version on her 1969 album, Back in Baby's Arms.
Marie Osmond released a version on her 1973 album, Paper Roses.

References

1961 songs
1961 singles
Brenda Lee songs
Loretta Lynn songs
Connie Smith songs
Marie Osmond songs
Decca Records singles